Daily Science Fiction is an email and online magazine devoted to publishing science fiction stories that was founded in 2010.  Per the title, it is a daily publication, publishing each weekday, edited by Jonathan Laden and Michele Barasso.

On Aug 11,2022, founders Michele and Jonathan announced the newsletter will be on hiatus either temporarily or somewhat longer beginning middle of December. The Jan 09, 2023 newsletter is the last sent out before the hiatus started.

Staff
Michele-Lee Barasso, Founder, Publisher, Editor in Chief
Jonathan Laden, Founder, Publisher, Editor in Chief
Elektra Hammond, Editor
Rachel McDonald, Editor
Sarah Overall, Editor
Brian White, Editor

Notable authors
Notable authors published in the magazine include:

 William Arthur
 Bruce Boston
 Paul Di Filippo
 Karina Fabian
 JG Faherty
 Eugie Foster
 Nina Kiriki Hoffman
 Eric Horwitz
 Stephen Jolly
 James Patrick Kelly
 Mary Robinette Kowal
 Jay Lake
 David D. Levine
 Shelly Li
 Ken Liu
 Sandra McDonald
 Will McIntosh
 Steven Popkes
 Tim Pratt
 Cat Rambo
 Robert Reed
 Mike Resnick
 Ramon Rozas III
 Jason Sanford
 Eric James Stone
 Lavie Tidhar
 Greg van Eekhout
 James Van Pelt
 Michael Vella
 Leslie What
 Caroline M. Yoachim

References

External links
 Official site

American literature websites
Magazines established in 2010
Online magazines published in the United States
Science fiction magazines published in the United States
Science fiction magazines established in the 2010s